The Riding Club Crime is the 172nd volume in the Nancy Drew Mystery Stories series of books.  It was released in 2003.

Plot summary
Nancy, George and Elsa are enjoying a horse ride, when Nancy's horse falls into a hole while attempting a four-foot jump over a post-and-rail.

Elsa is a counselor at Green Spring Pony Club summer camp, which has been vandalised by unknown persons. The owner, Mrs Rogers, is getting worried.  Nancy, disguised as a counselor, tries to figure out who the culprit is. As more incidents happen, the more Nancy realizes she has to work quickly. Will Nancy and her friends be able to keep the Green Spring Farm going?

References

Nancy Drew books
2003 American novels
2003 children's books
Pony books